Pierino Belli (20 March 1502, in Alba – 31 December 1575, in Turin) was an Italian soldier and jurist.

Belli served the Holy Roman Empire as the commander of Imperial forces in Piedmont. In 1560, Emmanuel Philibert, Duke of Savoy, named him a councillor of state. He is most notable for his book, De re militari et de bello (1563) which was one of the most comprehensive treatments of military law and the rules of war that had been written up to that time.

References
 treccani.it
 http://www.centrostudibeppefenoglio.it/Personaggi/personaggi_scheda.php?ID=8

External links
WorldCat page
CERL page

1502 births
1575 deaths
Italian soldiers
People from Alba, Piedmont
Military personnel of the Holy Roman Empire
16th-century Italian jurists